Cañada Rosquín is a small town (comuna) in the . It is located in the San Martín Department,  from the provincial capital (Santa Fe). It has a population of about 5,000 inhabitants.

The town was founded in 1891 by Rafael Escriña. As of 2005, the Communal President is Hugo Baltazar Dallari, of the Partido Vecinal.

The well-known pop-folk music composer and interpreter León Gieco is a native of Cañada Rosquín.

References
 
 

Populated places in Santa Fe Province